Nick Page (born August 1, 2002) is an American freestyle skier. He competed in the 2022 Winter Olympics in the men's moguls event and placed fifth.

Page was the second athlete to attempt a cork 1440 in a FIS level competition and the third mogul skier in the world to do a double cork 10 on a mogul course. He also became the youngest man ever to win a moguls Nor-Am event (2019 at Apex Mountain). He grew up in and trains out of Park City, Utah.

References

External links

Nick Page Official Website

2002 births
Living people
Freestyle skiers at the 2022 Winter Olympics
American male freestyle skiers
Olympic freestyle skiers of the United States
Sportspeople from Utah
21st-century American people